The World Challenge is a competition that was first hosted in 2005 by BBC and sponsored by Newsweek and Shell. It accepts projects from around the world that deal with social, environmental and community issues and uses business methods to try to improve upon those issues in the world.

The 2005 winners 
1st prize: Coconets, from a project in the Philippines called Juboken Enterprises
2nd and 3rd prize: Reef rehab and I Do Foundation

The 2006 winners 
1st prize: Elephant paper by Maximus (Sri Lanka)
2nd and 3rd prize: Cards from Africa and NGO Dalit

The 2007 winners 
1st prize: T'ikapapa, Potato Goldmine project in Peru.
2nd and 3rd prize: School for Success and Cooking without Gas

The 2008 winners 
1st prize: Hashoo Foundation, Plan Bee project in Pakistan.
2nd and 3rd prize: A Chance to Grow and School for Success

The 2009 winners 
1st prize: Safe Bottle Lamp Foundation, A Bright Idea project in Sri Lanka.
2nd and 3rd prize: Nothing Wasted and Fungi Town

The 2009 winners 
1st prize: AIDFI, The Only Way is Up project in the Philippines.
2nd and 3rd prize: A Class Apart and Pass it on

Sources
http://www.theworldchallenge.co.uk

Business and industry awards
Competitions
Recurring events established in 2005